William Lough (31 October 1886 – 1939) was an Australian cricketer. He played one first-class match for New South Wales in 1906/07.

See also
 List of New South Wales representative cricketers

References

External links
 

1886 births
1939 deaths
Australian cricketers
New South Wales cricketers
People from Bourke, New South Wales
Cricketers from New South Wales